Femme Fatale is a 2002 erotic thriller film written and directed by Brian De Palma. The film stars Antonio Banderas and Rebecca Romijn-Stamos. It was screened out of competition at the 2002 Cannes Film Festival.

The film became a box office flop. However, the film has since been better received by many film critics and gradually regarded as a cult classic. Warner Bros. had included the film in the catalogue of Warner Archive Collection.  In May 2022, Shout! Factory (under license from Warner Bros) released a special edition Blu-ray of the film.

Plot
Mercenary thief Laure Ash is part of a team executing a diamond heist at the Cannes Film Festival. The diamonds are located on a gold ensemble worn by model Veronica, who is accompanying real-life director Régis Wargnier to the premiere of his film East/West. Laure seduces Veronica in order to obtain the diamonds, during which her accomplices "Black Tie" and Racine provide support. However, the heist is botched and Laure ends up double-crossing her accomplices and escaping to Paris with the diamonds. In Paris, a series of events causes Laure to be mistaken for a missing Parisian woman named Lily who had recently disappeared. While Laure luxuriates in a tub in Lily's home, the real Lily returns and commits suicide while Laure secretly watches, providing Laure the opportunity to take her identity for good, and she leaves the country for the United States.

Seven years later, Laure (in her identity as "Lily") resurfaces in Paris as the wife of Bruce Watts, the new American ambassador to France. After arriving in France, a Spanish paparazzo named Nicolas Bardo takes her picture. The picture is displayed around Paris, and Black Tie (who has coincidentally been released from prison seven years after being arrested for the heist) spots Bardo's photo while in the middle of killing a woman, seen talking earlier with Laure at a café, by throwing her into the path of a speeding truck. With Laure exposed to her vengeful ex-accomplices, she decides to frame Bardo for her own (staged) kidnapping. Bardo is further manipulated by Laure into following through with the "kidnapping", and in the process, they begin a sexual relationship. The pair eventually meet with Bruce for a ransom exchange; however, Bardo has a crisis of conscience at the last moment and sabotages the scheme. In retaliation, Laure executes both Bruce and Bardo, only to be surprised by her ex-accomplices afterwards who promptly throw her off a bridge to her seeming death.

In an extended twist ending, the entirety of the film's events after Laure enters the tub in Lily's home are revealed to be a dream. In reality, Laure spies Lily entering the home as before, but this time Laure stops Lily from committing suicide. Seven years later, Laure and Veronica, who is revealed to have been Laure's partner all along, chat about the success of their diamond caper. Black Tie and Racine arrive seeking revenge, but they are indirectly killed by the same truck that killed Veronica in Laure's dream. Bardo, witnessing all these events, introduces himself to Laure, swearing that he has met her before, with Laure replying "Only in my dreams."

Cast

 Rebecca Romijn as Laure Ash / Lily Watts
 Antonio Banderas as Nicolas Bardo
 Peter Coyote as Ambassador Bruce Hewitt Watts
 Eriq Ebouaney as Black Tie
 Édouard Montoute as Racine
 Rie Rasmussen as Veronica
 Thierry Frémont as Inspector Serra
 Gregg Henry as Shiff
 Éva Darlan as Irma
 Fiona Curzon as Stanfield Phillips

Reception

Critical reception
The film received mixed reviews during its theatrical release; however, it was praised by several high-profile critics, including Manohla Dargis  and Roger Ebert, who gave it a 4 star review and called it one of De Palma's best films.  The film has a 49% rating on Rotten Tomatoes based on 136 reviews.

At the 2002 Stinkers Bad Movie Awards, the film received nominations for Worst Director (De Palma) and Worst Actress (Romijn-Stamos, also for Rollerball). Romijn-Stamos ended up winning Worst Female Fake Accent for this film and Rollerball.

Since then, Femme Fatale has been being revived in the eyes of many critics.  The film has since developed a cult status amongst cinephiles.

Box office
The film was a box office bomb, taking in less than its production costs worldwide.

In the North America, the film played very well in New York, Los Angeles, San Francisco, Toronto and Chicago, but also played weakly in the mid-section of the country.

The film generated more than $19.66 million in home video rentals in the United States (significantly higher than the film's United States box office gross).

References

External links

 
 
 
 
 
 

2002 films
2002 crime thriller films
2000s English-language films
2000s heist films
2000s mystery thriller films
American crime thriller films
American erotic thriller films
American heist films
American mystery thriller films
American neo-noir films
English-language French films
English-language German films
Films directed by Brian De Palma
Films scored by Ryuichi Sakamoto
Films set in Paris
Films shot in Paris
French crime thriller films
French heist films
French mystery thriller films
French neo-noir films
2000s French-language films
German crime thriller films
German heist films
German mystery thriller films
German neo-noir films
Warner Bros. films
2000s American films
2000s French films
2000s German films